Vera Agneta Luttropp (born 1945) is a Swedish politician and former member of the Riksdag, the national legislature. A member of the Green Party, she represented Västmanland County between October 2010 and September 2014.

References

1945 births
21st-century Swedish women politicians
Living people
Members of the Riksdag 2010–2014
Members of the Riksdag from the Green Party
Women members of the Riksdag